John Fairbairn (born 28 December 1983) is an Olympic Canadian skeleton racer.

References

External links
 

1983 births
Living people
Canadian male skeleton racers
Olympic skeleton racers of Canada
Skeleton racers at the 2014 Winter Olympics
Sportspeople from London, Ontario
20th-century Canadian people
21st-century Canadian people